Peter Snow (executed at York, 15 June 1598) was an English Roman Catholic priest. He is a Catholic martyr, along with Ralph Grimston who died with him, beatified in 1987. Their liturgical celebration is on 15 June.

Life
He was born at or near Ripon and arrived at the English College, Reims, 17 April 1589. He received the first tonsure and minor orders 18 August 1590, the subdiaconate at Laon on 22 September, and the diaconate and priesthood at Soissons on 30 and 31 March 1591. He left for England on the following 15 May. 

It appears that he spent some time at Nidd Hall, the seat of the Trappes family, near Knaresborough. Nidd Hall was used to shelter priests. Ralph Grimston also lived at the hall. They were arrested on or about 1 May 1598, when on their way to York. Both were shortly after condemned, Snow of treason as being a priest and Grimston of felony, for having aided and assisted him, and, it is said, having lifted up his weapon to defend him at his apprehension. They were executed at Knavesmire in York. Snow was hanged, draw and quartered; Grimston hanged. Their severed heads were place on spikes and set atop Micklegate Bar until retrieved by some local Catholics. He was 32.

Relics in Leeds Cathedral

In 1845, two skulls were discovered under the stone floor of the ancient chapel of Hazlewood Castle, near Tadcaster. At the time they were thought to be relics of two other English martyrs, John Lockwood and Edmund Catherick and the skulls were placed in a niche near the altar. In 1909, Dom Hildebrand Lane Fox, who was familiar with local traditions stated that they were the relics of Peter Snow and Ralph Grimston. In 1968, the Carmelites acquired Hazlewood and a forensic examination was conducted on the skulls. By determining the approximate age of the individuals, Lockwood and Catherick were excluded. 

In 2005, Arthur Roche, Bishop of Leeds, decided to place relics in Leeds Cathedral altar. The BBC's Inside Out program commissioned computerised likenesses from the University of Dundee. Pictures of the reconstructed faces of Blessed Fr.Peter Snow and Ralph Grimston can be found on Leeds Cathedral webpage.

See also
 Douai Martyrs
 Eighty-five martyrs of England and Wales

References

External links
Relics in the Cathedral

1598 deaths
16th-century English Roman Catholic priests
English beatified people
16th-century venerated Christians
Year of birth unknown
People from Ripon
16th-century Roman Catholic martyrs
Martyred Roman Catholic priests
16th-century births
People executed under Elizabeth I
Executed people from North Yorkshire
People executed under the Tudors for treason against England
Eighty-five martyrs of England and Wales